Valda Lake (born 11 October 1968) is a former tennis player from Great Britain who began playing professionally in 1983 and retired in 1997. Over the course of her career she reached a career-high singles ranking of world number 172 in singles (achieved on 11 April 1988) and number 56 in doubles (achieved on 20 June 1994). During her career, Lake was more successful in doubles than she was in singles, winning eight ITF titles and reaching the final of the 1994 China Open. She represented Great Britain in the Olympics held in Atlanta 1996 playing doubles with Clare Wood and reaching the quarter-finals before losing to the Gold Medalist American Team- Gigi Fernandez and Mary Jo Fernandez.
Currently lives in Los Angeles and owns an art gallery "Wallspace" and is a set decorator in TV commercials.

WTA tour and ITF circuit finals

Singles: 2 (1–1)

Doubles: 18 (8–10)

References

External links
 
 
 

1968 births
Living people
English female tennis players
Olympic tennis players of Great Britain
Tennis players at the 1996 Summer Olympics
British female tennis players
Tennis people from Devon